Richard Knight Causton, 1st Baron Southwark PC, DL (25 September 1843 – 23 February 1929) was an English stationer and Liberal politician who sat in the House of Commons in two periods between 1880 and 1910. In the same year he was raised to the peerage and sat in the House of Lords.

Background
Causton was born in Deptford, Kent the son of Sir Joseph Causton alderman and sheriff of London and his wife Mary Anne Porter, daughter of Edward Porter. He was a partner in the firm of Causton and Sons, stationers and printers in Eastcheap, Southwark Street and Cary Street. He was a commissioner of lieutenancy for the City of London and a member of the Worshipful Company of Skinners of which he was master in 1877.

Political career
Causton unsuccessfully contested Colchester in 1874, but was successfully returned for the constituency in 1880. However, he lost his seat in 1885 and once again stood unsuccessfully for the constituency in 1886. In 1888 he was successfully returned for Southwark West in a by-election, a seat he held until 1910. He served under William Ewart Gladstone and the Earl of Rosebery as a Junior Lord of the Treasury between 1892 and 1895 and continued as Liberal Whip until 1905. When the Liberals returned to power in December 1905 under Sir Henry Campbell-Bannerman, Causton was made Paymaster-General. In January 1906 he was sworn of the Privy Council. He remained as Paymaster-General until 1910, the last two years under the premiership of H. H. Asquith. He lost his seat in parliament in 1910. The same year he was raised to the peerage as Baron Southwark, of Southwark in the County of London.

Causton was a Fellow of the Statistical Society, President of the London Chamber of Commerce in 1913 and Master of the Skinners Company again in 1921/22.

Personal life
Lord Southwark died in February 1929, aged 85, his estate probated in the London Registry at £21282 12s 2d. The barony became extinct on his death.

Causton married in 1871 Selina Mary Chambers, daughter of Sir Thomas Chambers QC, MP for Marylebone.

References

External links 
 

Southwark, Richard Knight Causton, 1st Baron
Southwark, Richard Knight Causton, 1st Baron
Southwark, Richard Knight Causton, 1st Baron
Liberal Party (UK) MPs for English constituencies
Southwark, Richard Knight Causton, 1st Baron
Southwark
UK MPs 1880–1885
UK MPs 1886–1892
UK MPs 1892–1895
UK MPs 1895–1900
UK MPs 1900–1906
UK MPs 1906–1910
UK MPs who were granted peerages